Valeriy Vasylyev (born 21 April 1976) is a retired athlete who specialised in the long jump. His biggest success was the gold medal at the 2003 Summer Universiade.

His personal bests in the event are 8.21 metres outdoors (2004) and 8.19 metres indoors (2003).

Competition record

References

Ukrainian male long jumpers
Universiade medalists in athletics (track and field)
1976 births
Living people
Universiade gold medalists for Ukraine
Medalists at the 2003 Summer Universiade